Herscher may refer to:

Herscher, Illinois
Herscher High School
Herscher (surname)

See also
 Herrscher (disambiguation)